The 1995 Big West Conference baseball tournament determined the conference champion for the Big West Conference at the end of the 1995 season. The four teams met in the double-elimination tournament from May 12 through 14 at Long Beach State's on campus facility, Blair Field. Cal State Fullerton won the tournament, earning the league's automatic bid to the 1995 NCAA Division I baseball tournament, en route to winning the College World Series for the third time.

This would be the second postseason conference championship event sponsored by the league, and the first with greater than two teams. The event would be held for the next four years before being discontinued.

Seeding and format 
The top four teams at the end of the conference's round robin regular season were seeded one through four based on conference winning percentage only.

Bracket 
The following bracket depicts the results of the tournament.

References 

Tournament
Big West Conference Baseball Championship